In basketball, true shooting percentage is an advanced statistic that measures a player's efficiency at shooting the ball. It is intended to more accurately calculate a player's shooting than field goal percentage, free throw percentage, and three-point field goal percentage taken individually.  Two- and three-point field goals and free throws are all considered in its calculation.  It is abbreviated TS%.

It is calculated by: 

where:
PTS = points scored,
FGA = field goal attempts,
FTA = free throw attempts

References

Basketball statistics
Percentages